Behzad Nabavi (born 1941) is an Iranian reformist politician. He served as Deputy Speaker of the Parliament of Iran and was one of the founders of the reformist party Mojahedin of the Islamic Revolution Organization. Prior to his career as a democratic reformist, Nabavi was considered an ideologue of the Iranian Islamic left until that force was sidelined by conservatives in the 1990s.

Early life
Nabavi was born in Tehran in 1941. His father was a historian, He graduated from Amir Kabir University of Technology with a bachelor's degree in electrical engineering in the mid-1960s. He received a master's degree in electrical engineering in 1964.

Career and activities
Nabavi started his political activity as a guerrilla fighter against the Pahlavi government and served a prison term as a result. He has personally confirmed that when he was arrested in 1972, he had tried suicide by swallowing a cyanide pill, which "fortunately or unfortunately" did not work.

During the Islamic Revolution he was among the founders of the Islamic Revolution Committees (known as komite or komiteh in Iran) which served as a security force mainly working against armed opposition parties and militia, the early years of the Islamic Republic. Nabavi was also a founder of the intelligence office under the Presidency, which later became the ministry of intelligence.

Nabavi acted as the chief negotiator of Iran during the discussions with United States officials in the Iran hostage crisis, where he has been described as a "radical" who gained influence at the expense of "moderates" as a result of the crisis.

Nabavi served in different posts in the government of Iran, including a member of the Central Committee of the Islamic Revolution, the head of the Setad-e Basij-e Eghtesadi-e Keshvar (the body that introduced government-issued coupons because of economical difficulties of the Iran–Iraq War), which made the conservatives call him a couponist (which rhymes with communist in Persian), minister of heavy industries under Mir-Hossein Mousavi, and a representative of Tehran to the parliament (39% of ballots in 2000).

He also worked in some state-owned petroleum companies, and acted as the chairman of the board in Petropars and a consultant to the CEO in Mapna, a company working on the expansion of oil refineries in Iran.

As a member of the parliament, Nabavi has been one of the major critics of the Council of Guardians, the body which both vets candidates for political office and can veto legislation passed by parliament. In turn, the council banned him from running for re-election for parliamental in 2004 along with 80 other incumbents. On 1 February 2004, Nabavi resigned from parliament together with more than 100 MPs, and his resignation was accepted by a 154/22/7 (for/against/absentation) vote by the parliament on 18 April 2004. In his resignation speech, he mentioned the "violation of public rights" to be his main reason for resignation.

Nabavi was also prohibited from running for office in other elections, and summoned by the judiciary for libel and "disturbing the public mind", when he was serving as an MP and hence certain restrictions applied for such summoning.

Nabavi is among the people who started the notions of insider and outsider in the Islamic Republic, an idea that is mainly used by the conservatives. He still personally follows a division of insider and outsider, and does not sign the political declarations of his own party if it is co-signed by the Freedom Movement Party, a nationalist-religious party whose members have served as the first interim government of the Islamic Republic, but is now considered illegal by certain officials in the government, from both reformists and conservatives. Behzad Nabavi and Ali Akbar Mohtashami were among those who prevented by the Guardian council from taking part in the elections of Majlis.

Arrest
Nabavi was arrested after the 2009 Iran Presidential Election. He was sentenced to six years in prison by the court in February 2010.

References

External links

1941 births
Living people
First Deputies of Islamic Consultative Assembly
Second Deputies of Islamic Consultative Assembly
Government ministers of Iran
Mojahedin of the Islamic Revolution of Iran Organization politicians
Amirkabir University of Technology alumni
Iranian Islamist guerrillas
Spokespersons of the Government of Iran
Members of the 6th Islamic Consultative Assembly
National Front (Iran) student activists
Impeached Iranian officials
Iranian politicians convicted of crimes
Early People's Mojahedin Organization of Iran members
Politicians from Tehran